The Algeria–Tunisia border is 1,034 km (642 mi) in length and runs from the Mediterranean Sea in the north to the tripoint with Libya in the south.

Description
The border starts in the north at the Mediterranean coast, proceeding overland in a broadly southwards directions via a series of overland lines. In the southern sections of the border straight lines predominate, which eventually veer to the south-east down to the tripoint with Libya.

History
France occupied much of the northern coastal areas of Algeria in the period 1830-47 and Tunisia in 1881, both of which had hitherto been subject to the nominal control of the Ottoman Empire. France gradually pushed inland, annexing the Saharan areas of Algeria in 1902. The border from the coast south to Bir Ramane was established by various French decrees, notably those of 1888-89 and 1901–01. The sections south of this down to the Libyan tripoint was somewhat vaguer, and appear to have been delimited during the period 1911–23.

Tunisia gained independence from France in 1956, followed by Algeria (following a bloody war) in 1962. The two states then confirmed the existing boundary between them by an agreement of 6 January 1960, with relations generally being positive.

Settlements near the border

Algeria
 Lacroix
 Roum el Souk
 Oued Mougras
 Sidi Fhrerib
 Mechtat Ahmed
 Ouenza
 Aïn Zerga
 Ain Kouif
 Tébessa
 Oum Ali

Tunisia
 Tabarka
 Ain Draham
 Ghardimaou
 Hennchir Abid
 Sakiet Sidi Youssef
 Charpin Ville
 Haïdra
 Ain Amara
 Dernaia
 Moularès
 Tamerza

See also
 Algeria–Tunisia relations

References

 
Borders of Algeria
Borders of Tunisia
International borders